Sahim Saleh Mehdi (born 17 October 1967) is a former South Yemen athlete, who competed at the 1988 Summer Olympic Games in the men's 200m, he finished 8th in his heat and failed to advance.

References

External links

Athletes (track and field) at the 1988 Summer Olympics
Yemeni male sprinters
Olympic athletes of South Yemen
1967 births

Living people
20th-century Yemeni people